The Scroll may refer to:

School newspaper for The American School in London
Newspaper for Brigham Young University–Idaho
Official magazine of Phi Delta Theta fraternity